Carex asperifructus is a tussock-forming perennial in the family Cyperaceae, that is native to parts of China.

See also
 List of Carex species

References

asperifructus
Plants described in 1929
Taxa named by Georg Kükenthal
Flora of China